Events in the year 1878 in Iceland.

Incumbents 

 Monarch: Christian IX
 Minister for Iceland: Johannes Nellemann

Events 

 The original Reykjanesviti structure was constructed.

 1878 – Krakatindur east of Hekla erupts. (Part of the East volcanic zone (EVZ))

References 

 
1870s in Iceland
Years of the 19th century in Iceland
Iceland
Iceland